The Tule Desert is a small desert located in southwestern Arizona near the U.S.-Mexico border. It is considered to be part of the Lower Colorado Valley region of the Sonoran Desert. It lies in a north–south direction to the east of the Cabeza Prieta Mountains and almost entirely in the Barry M. Goldwater Air Force Range. The Tule Desert also lies on the northern border of the Gran Desierto de Altar of Sonora, Mexico.

See also 
 List of flora of the Sonoran Desert Region by common name
 Fauna of the Sonoran Desert

References 

 Sonoran Desert

Sonoran Desert
Deserts and xeric shrublands in the United States
Ecoregions of the United States
Deserts of the Lower Colorado River Valley
Deserts of the Gran Desierto de Altar
Deserts of Arizona